Niels Schneider (born 18 June 1987) is a Franco-Canadian actor who has appeared in more than thirty films since 2007. Born in Paris, naturalized Canadian, Schneider moved to Montreal at the age of 9 to start his career doing voice-over jobs. He had his breakthrough role in Xavier Dolan's film I Killed My Mother (2009), and gained international recognition in Dolan's Heartbeats (2010). In 2011, he won the Trophée Chopard Award for Male Revelation of the Year at the Cannes Film Festival. In 2017, he won the César Award for Most Promising Actor for his performance in Dark Inclusion (2016). In 2019, he was named a Knight of the Order of Arts and Letters in France.

Filmography

Decorations
 Knight of the Order of Arts and Letters (2019)

References

External links 

  
 

1987 births
Male actors from Paris
Male actors from Montreal
Living people
Canadian male film actors
Canadian male television actors
Most Promising Actor César Award winners
Canadian people of Lebanese-Jewish descent
Chevaliers of the Ordre des Arts et des Lettres
Chopard Trophy for Male Revelation winners